Hagberg may refer to:

People
 Brita Hagberg (1756–1825), a woman who served as a soldier in the Swedish army during the Russo-Swedish War
 Carl August Hagberg (1810–1864), a Swedish linguist and translator
 Christin Hagberg (born 1958), a Swedish social democratic politician
 David Hagberg (born 1942), a prolific American novelist
 Edvin Hagberg (1875–1947), a Swedish sailor who competed in the 1908 and 1912 Summer Olympics
 Garry L. Hagberg, an author, professor, philosopher, and jazz musician
 Göran Hagberg (born 1947), a former Swedish football goalkeeper
 Henrik Hagberg (born 1975), a Swedish Bandy player who currently plays for Sandvikens AIK as a midfielder
 Hilding Hagberg (1899–1993), a Swedish communist politician
 Justin Hagberg, a guitarist of Canadian heavy metal band 3 Inches of Blood
 Liselott Hagberg (born 1958), a Swedish Liberal People's Party politician
 Michael Hagberg (born 1954), a Swedish social democratic politician
 Oscar Hagberg, the 25th head college football coach for the United States Naval Academy Midshipmen located in Annapolis, Maryland
 Sven Hagberg, one of the creators of the Falling Number test
 Charles Theodore Hagberg Wright (1862–1940), English librarian informally called Hagberg

Places
 Hagberg (Welzheim Forest), a hill in the Swabian-Franconian Forest, Baden-Württemberg, Germany
 Hagberg, a village in the municipality of Mank, Melk District, Lower Austria

See also
 Hagenberg